Otto English is the pen name of writer and journalist Andrew Scott.

Scott had written for theatre and television before moving into political journalism. From 2010 he began writing about history and politics, often through his blog, The Pinprick. According to his blog, Scott came up with the pen name Otto English on the spot when asked to appear on a BBC programme. The rise to fame of actor Andrew Scott then persuaded English to stick with the pen name "rather than get confused with Moriarty", whom the actor had played in the BBC One drama Sherlock.

He has written extensively for Politico and Byline Times, and published a non-fiction book, Fake History, in 2021. Fake History looks at "the 10 biggest lies from history and... at the people who propagated them", including the idea that the British royal family are German, or that Adolf Hitler was a failed artist.

English has also frequently appeared on Byline Times TV channel, and written for the website about British history and the country's obsession with class.

English has been called an "anti-Brexit firebrand" by historian Dominic Sandbrook, who labelled the author a "woke activist" in his critical review of Fake History on UnHerd. Fake History received generally positive reviews from The South African, BusinessLive.co.za and The Canberra Times.

References

Year of birth missing (living people)
Living people
British journalists
British writers
British republicans